Agaraju was a king of Kosambi. He was part of the Mitra dynasty of Kosambi.

Name
Many of the rulers of Mitra dynasty bear the suffix "-mitra" in their names.

Genealogy

A genealogy constructed from the Bharhut inscriptions suggest he may have been father of Dhanabhuti, who is known for the Bharhut inscriptions. Visvadeva would be father of Agaraju.

He is considered to be an early ruler in the dynasty.

Coins of Agaraju
Most rulers of the Mitra dynasty of Kosambi, except Radhamitra, have the symbol known as the tree-in-railing in their coins. Another common symbol is the Ujjain symbol. Bull is a common animal to appear on the coinage of Kosambi of the era.

References

2nd-century BC Indian monarchs